Suburban Virgin is a 2003 Finnish television drama film directed by Hanna Maylett. The film was made for Yle TV1 using amateur actors. Suburban Virgin follows a hitchhiking journey of two 16-year-old girls.

The literal translation of the original title Espoon viimeinen neitsyt would be "the last virgin of Espoo".

Cast 
 Hennariikka Laaksola as Minna
 Saila Laakkonen as Emma
 Lauri Kontula
 Maria Krestjanoff
 Linda Lindfors
 Jukka Reinikainen

References

External links 
 
 

2003 television films
2003 films
2000s coming-of-age drama films
Films about virginity
Films set in Finland
Films shot in Finland
Finnish drama films
Finnish television films
Films about hitchhiking
2000s teen drama films
2003 drama films
2000s Finnish-language films